Austrosimulium is a subgenus of Austrosimulium, a genus of Simuliidae (black flies).  The flies in this subgenre are found mainly in New Zealand, with a few in Australia. They are the only Simuliidae found in New Zealand.

In New Zealand, where they are known as sandflies, the females of three species – A. australense, A. tillyardianum and A. ungulatum – bite humans; the males do not. A. australense is found in the North Island, South Island, Stewart Island and some offshore islands; it is the sandfly that is encountered most commonly in the North Island and the main one that bites humans there. A. tillyardianum is found in the North Island and the South Island. A. ungulatum  is found in the South Island and Stewart Island, and is well-known for biting humans.

Species
A. albovelatum Dumbleton, 1973
A. alveolatum Dumbleton, 1973
A. australense (Schiner, 1868)
A. bicorne Dumbleton, 1973
A. campbellense Dumbleton, 1973
A. cornutum Tonnoir, 1925
A. crassipes Tonnoir, 1925
A. dugdalei Craig, Craig & Crosby, 2012
A. dumbletoni Crosby, 1976
A. extendorum Craig, Craig & Crosby, 2012
A. fiordense Dumbleton, 1973
A. fulvicorne Mackerras & Mackerras, 1950
A. laticorne Tonnoir, 1925
A. longicorne Tonnoir, 1925
A. mirabile Mackerras & Mackerras, 1948
A. montanum Mackerras & Mackerras, 1952
A. multicorne Tonnoir, 1925
A. stewartense Dumbleton, 1973
A. tillyardianum Dumbleton, 1973
A. tonnoiri Craig, Craig & Crosby, 2012
A. ungulatum Tonnoir, 1925
A. unicorne Dumbleton, 1973
A. vailavoense Craig, Craig & Crosby, 2012
A. vexans (Mik, 1881)

References

External links 

Simuliidae
Diptera of New Zealand
Insect subgenera